ESNA or ESNA European Higher Education News is an independent news agency and journalism network based in Berlin. It specialises in news and analysis in the field of European higher education and research policy. The agency’s services include multilingual press reviews and news coverage, dossiers, book reviews, policy research monitoring, debates, conferences, reports, podcast, video, and translation.

History 
ESNA originates from LETSWORK Journal for Student Work, a quarterly journal that was first published in 1999 by the student labour agency TUSMA in Berlin. TUSMA provided 20,000 international students with jobs and started LETSWORK as a cross-cultural channel to advise students on immigration, labour laws and student rights in higher education.

In 2002, LETSWORK evolved into WORK|OUT European Students’ Review, published by a non-profit organisation in Berlin. This new incarnation published free and multilingual news in cooperation with students in German, French, Italian, Polish and Spanish university cities. It also organised conferences and cultural events in Italy and Germany.

In 2004 and 2005, WORK|OUT won the Italian national award for innovative content and solutions in print and multimedia, the Premio Palinsesto Italia. In 2006, WORK|OUT was recognised as one of the ten best student papers in Germany. 2006 also saw the emergence of Europe for Students (EforS), the precursor of StartupTV.

As WORK|OUT moved away from its earlier student-centred focus into the broader area of higher education policy news and analysis, the student paper was beginning to develop into a separate organisation. Finally, in 2008 the editorial core group of WORK|OUT saw the need for a new professional channel and ESNA European Higher Education News was founded.

Since 2014, ESNA has been active in the area of video journalism, working with the film company Caucaso from Bologna (The Golden Temple). This collaboration resulted, among others, in the co-production of “University-Business Forum” (Berlin, 2014), “Documenting EUROSTUDENT V” (Vienna, 2015), and “Wie breit ist die Spitze?” on the German Excellency Initiative (Berlin, 2016).

Since 2019, ESNA has started the project “United Universities of Europe” or UUU; it documents the development of European University Alliances and observers larger trends of concentration, networking and digitalisation in the higher education sector.

Working area 
ESNA’s news network consists of young journalists focusing on European higher education policy news and analysis. Issues covered include: European University Alliances, international university rankings, international student recruitment, globalisation and higher education research, as well as tertiary education systems, policies and reforms, higher education funding and liberalisation. ESNA also covers EU policy and the Bologna Process, with an interest in highlighting social and financial barriers to participation, academic mobility and intercultural dialogue in higher education.

Network and activities 
ESNA manages a network of correspondents across Europe. It currently operates on four levels:
 Editorial office in Berlin
 Correspondents/freelance journalists
 A network of expert analysts
 Partner organisations and partner media

Network building and reader engagement are integral to ESNA’s modus operandi. Another way ESNA integrates with the scientific community is through the moderation of conferences. The news agency also offers internships on a bi-annual basis for international students and graduates.

Political stance 
ESNA is an independent journalistic observer and publisher of objective information. They translate news stories from their original languages into English and German to promote easier access to articles pertaining to European higher education and science policy.
In April 2005, ESNA’s forerunner WORK|OUT organised a conference on Censorship and Free Media at the Università Iuav di Venezia. At this event, Peter Preston, then editor of the Guardian newspaper, helped to inspire ESNA’s mission, which was to be founded three years later. Mr Preston stated that “It’s the bit that Europe’s founding fathers left out. We are building a great new edifice of freedom without a free press which mirrors and shadows that growth. This has to emerge from the ground up, built on individual contacts and individual enthusiasms. We have to start building our own public opinion, and the moment is now.”

References

ESNA European Higher Education News